Madurai Veeran Enga Saami is a 1990 Tamil-language film starring Sathyaraj in the lead role pairing with Rupini.

Cast
Sathyaraj as Mathi
Rupini as Sakthi
Goundamani as Balloon Kandasamy
Senthil as Balusamy
Jayabharathi as Theivanai
Vinu Chakravarthy
Manorama
Sathyapriya as Nachiyar
Pandu 
Vijay Krishnaraj 
Typist Gopu
T. M. Samikannu
C. K. Saraswathi
Lalitha Kumari
S. R. Vijaya as Alamelu
Kullamani
Ajay Rathnam
Thyagu

Soundtrack
Soundtrack was composed by Ilayaraja.

References

External links
 

1990 films
1990s Tamil-language films
Films scored by Ilaiyaraaja
Indian comedy films